Karen Lehrman Bloch is an American writer and cultural critic.

Career
Lehrman Bloch's criticism of women's studies programs in a September/October 1993 cover story for Mother Jones "ignited heated exchanges in the women's studies community, the press, and on radio talk shows around the country." In the subsequent November/December issue, Mother Jones published 14 responses to Lehrman Bloch's piece, most prominently feminist writer Susan Faludi. In 1994, Lehrman Bloch told The Boston Globe, "Feminism has become orthodoxy. There's a great stigma about speaking out, like you're breaking the sisterhood. So no one does." Writing for The New York Times in 1995, Wendy Kaminer called Lehrman Bloch "perhaps the sharpest of the young individualist critics" of third-wave feminism. In her 1997 book The Lipstick Proviso: Women, Sex & Power in the Real World, Lehrman Bloch protested "group-think" feminism.

In 2021, Lehrman Bloch launched White Rose Magazine, where she serves as editor-in-chief. The magazine, named after the White Rose resistance group in Nazi Germany, is dedicated to classical liberalism and opposing extremism. In an interview for the Jewish Journal in 2022, Lehrman Bloch explained why she believes classical liberalism is being subverted and how White Rose provides a path back to classical liberal principles, like heterodoxy and ethics.

Bibliography

References

External links
 

Year of birth missing (living people)
Living people
20th-century American women writers
21st-century American women writers